Princess Dibyalangkarn or Phra Chao Boromwongse Ther Phra Ong Chao Dibyalangkarn (RTGS: Thipphayalangkan) (17 January 1891 – 4 June 1932), was a Princess of Siam (later Thailand). She was a member of Siamese Royal Family. She is a daughter of Chulalongkorn, King Rama V of Siam.

Her mother was The Noble Consort (Chao Chom Manda) Sae Rojanadis, daughter of Phraya Abbhantrikamas and Bang Rojanadis. She had 2 full siblings; an elder brother and an elder sister;
 Prince Khajera Chirapradidha (23 July 1888 – 7 October 1888)
 Princess Abbhantripaja (31 October 1889 – 18 February 1934)

Princess Dibyalangkarn died on 4 June 1932, at the age of only 41.

Ancestry

1891 births
1932 deaths
19th-century Thai women
20th-century Thai women
19th-century Chakri dynasty
20th-century Chakri dynasty
Thai female Phra Ong Chao
Dames Grand Commander of the Order of Chula Chom Klao
Children of Chulalongkorn
Daughters of kings